Porte-de-Benauge (Gascon: Pòrta de Benauja) is a commune in the Gironde department in southwestern France. It was established on 1 January 2019 by merger of the former communes of Arbis (the seat) and Cantois.

See also
Communes of the Gironde department

References

Communes of Gironde
States and territories established in 2019